Muhammad Azeem (born 11 April 1955) is a Pakistani wrestler. He competed in the men's freestyle 57 kg at the 1988 Summer Olympics.

References

External links
 

1955 births
Living people
Pakistani male sport wrestlers
Olympic wrestlers of Pakistan
Wrestlers at the 1988 Summer Olympics
Place of birth missing (living people)
Asian Games medalists in wrestling
Asian Games silver medalists for Pakistan
Wrestlers at the 1978 Asian Games
Wrestlers at the 1986 Asian Games
Medalists at the 1978 Asian Games
20th-century Pakistani people